Mourning Grave (lit. "Girl Ghost Story") is a 2014 South Korean mystery horror film starring Kang Ha-neul and Kim So-eun.

Synopsis
In-soo, a high school student, has a special gift to see ghosts. He transfers to a high school in a rural area outside of Seoul. Plagued by them everywhere he goes and harassed by classmates because of it, he returns to his hometown to live with his uncle and finally put the past to rest. No sooner does he arrive than he sees his first ghost there, a pretty girl; but, just like before, it's not just ghosts that affect his life. School bullies remain a problem, but soon along, the bullies start being attacked by a vengeful ghost wearing a bloody mask, and In-su starts to think that his new friend, the pretty ghost, may have something to do with it.

Cast
Kang Ha-neul as Kang In-soo
Kim So-eun as Jung Se-hee (Ghost girl)
Kim Jung-tae as Seon-il
Han Hye-rin as Park Hyun-ji
Park Doo-shik as Lee Hae-chul
Joo Min-ha as Yoon Na-ra
Joo Da-young as Lee Sung-hee
Lee Bom as Hye-jung
Kwak Jung-wook as Lee Ki-tae 
Kim Young-choon as Ho-seop
Lee Ah-hyun as Oh Mi-hee
Oh Yoon-hong as Ah-young's mother
Yoon Chan-young as Kang In-soo (young)
Shin Soo-yeon as Jung Se-hee (young)

Original soundtrack

Box office
Since its domestic release on July 3, 2014, the film has grossed , with 216,000 ticket sales.

International release
At the Cannes Film Market, Mourning Grave was pre-sold to China, Hong Kong, Taiwan, Singapore and Mongolia.

References

External links
 
 
 

South Korean horror films
2014 films
2014 horror films
South Korean mystery films
2010s South Korean films